The Norwegian Press Association (NP) is Norwegian association established in 1910, for press people with journalism as their main profession. Among its members are the Norwegian Union of Journalists, the Association of Norwegian Editors, Norsk Lokalradioforbund and the Norwegian Media Businesses' Association.

The current Secretary General is Elin Floberghagen. Kjersti Løken Stavrum was Secretary General from 2013- 2016. Per Edgar Kokkvold from 1996–2013.

References

External links
Official site 

Organisations based in Oslo
Organizations established in 1910
Journalism-related professional associations
1910 establishments in Norway